Sulfacytine is a short-acting sulfonamide antibiotic, taken orally for treatment against bacterial infections. Sulfonamides, as a group of antibiotics, work by inhibiting the bacterial synthesis of folate.  In 2006 the drug was discontinued

References

Sulfonamide antibiotics
Abandoned drugs